School Without Walls, located in Rochester, New York, United States, is a high school for students in grades 9-12, and is an example of an alternative school.

Demographics
Hispanic 16.5%
White 24.3%
African American 57.0%
Asian 1.5%
Native American 0.8%

The free/reduced lunch rate is 68% of students.

History
In 1968, students at Monroe High School presented an idea to the principal for an alternative education program. In October 1969, teachers began helping students attain their goal. Parents, teachers and students soon joined forces. Led by Lew Marks (1932-2010), an English teacher at the school, they presented a proposal for the School Without Walls to the District Superintendent in January 1971. On February 4, 1971, the Board of Education approved the proposal that created the School Without Walls, which opened in September 1971 at 4 Elton Street, sharing space with the Visual Studies Workshop at the time.

Subsequent locations included the 5th floor of the building at 50 West Main Street, and a floor of the building at 400 Andrews Street, both in Rochester. School Without Walls moved to its present building, the former Sears Automotive building located near Monroe High School, in 1987. The middle school was closed in 2013.

Notable alumni
 Branden Albert
 Nicholson Baker
 Jim Hilgartner
 Joy Ladin

See also
Rochester City School District

References

External links
School Without Walls

Alternative schools in the United States
Educational institutions established in 1971
High schools in Monroe County, New York
Public high schools in New York (state)
Public middle schools in New York (state)